Charles Kidd may refer to:

Chip Kidd (born 1964), American graphic designer 
Charles Kidd II (born 1987) or Calmatic, American music video director